Freels may refer to:

Places 
 Cape Freels, a headland on the island of Newfoundland, Canada
 Freels Farm Mounds, an archaeological site in Tennessee, United States

People 
 Katy Freels (born 1990), American soccer midfielder

See also 
 Freel
 Friels